Ko Antey Koti is a 2012 released Telugu-language romantic heist thriller film starring Sharwanand, Priya Anand and Sri Hari. It was directed by Anish Kuruvilla and produced by Sharwanand's mother, Myneni Vasundhara Devi, under Sarvaa Arts.

Plot

Vamsi (Sharwanand),a thief who is looking to mend his ways is hired by Maya Master (Sri Hari) another thief who plans on becoming rich on the premise of carrying out one last heist and retire. Maya master has assembled a gang for this purpose. Vamsi and the gang succeed in carrying out the robbery after which Maya Master betrays them and gets away with the money what happened next forms the story.

Cast

 Sharwanand as Koti aka Vamsi
 Priya Anand as Sathya 
 Srihari as Mayaloori Madan aka Maya Master
 Lakshman Meesala as Chitti
 Nischal as PC
 Vinay Varma as Ranjit Kumar
 Prabhakar as Don Fredrick
 Thagubothu Ramesh as Drunkard
 Prudhvi Raj

Soundtrack

The audio was composed by Shakti Kanth Karthick. The audio launch of the film was held at Hitex, Hyderabad.  Ram Charan was the chief guest at the event. Navdeep, Sundeep Kishan, Deva Katta, Sekhar Kammula Kamal Kamaraju, S Gopal Reddy, B Gopal, Sravanthi Ravi Kishore, Srihari, Shiva Balaji and others attended the function.

Reception

The album was much appreciated with 123telugu calling it "Refreshingly New".
IndiaGlitz in its review noted that "Three of the six songs were tuned with melody base (Madhurimave..., Varala Vana.. and Bangaru Konda...) while two are tuned with heavy metal genre (Ko antey Koti... The title song and the last song 'Deham Daaham...' belongs to this kind of heavy metal music.) One song Aagipo was tuned with good fusion of guitar, violin and percussion instruments. So, four out of six songs are melodious and soothing to ears, while two would be loved by present generation youth".

Release
The film was given an A certificate by the Censor board due to the violence and unsavoury language. The film was released on 28 December 2012.

Reception

Critical response
The film received mixed response from critics.

Avad.M of 123telugu.com has given a rating of 2.75 out of 5 stating "Ko Antey Koti, which could have been a decent thriller, is seriously let down by poor execution. Super performances by Sri Hari and Sharwanand are sure shot plus points. On the flip side, lack of thrilling moments,bad character justification and a weak first half are major let downs. Finally, Ko Antey Koti is just a below average treat."
 News18 noted that "It is definitely one of the best Telugu films of the recent past. But what makes this strikingly different film uninspiring is its borrowed inspiration from the west."

References

2010s Telugu-language films
2012 films
Indian romantic thriller films
Indian thriller drama films
Indian heist films
2010s heist films
2010s romantic thriller films
2012 thriller drama films